Telpay Incorporated is the largest independent electronic payment company in Canada, processing over $19.5 billion in 2020.

The company's flagship product is Telpay for Business, an electronic payment software for businesses which eliminates the need for cheques.

History
Telpay was founded in 1985 as a research-and-development division of Comcheq Services, a payroll company started by Bill Loewen in 1968. In March 1985, the first reports of telephone-generated bill payments were delivered to Manitoba Hydro and Manitoba Telephone System. 

In 1992, Loewen sold Comcheq to CIBC, but retained control of the Telpay division, thereby establishing Telpay Incorporated, with Loewen as chair.

Organization 
Telpay headquarters is located in downtown Winnipeg, in a heritage building built in 1909 by the Canada Permanent Trust Company. The current President is Kevin Sokolowski.

See also
Electronic bill payment
Online banking
Electronic business
E-commerce
Electronic funds transfer
Comparison of shopping cart software
Federal Financial Institutions Examination Council

References

External links
 Official TelPay website
E-Carts
See Credit Union Above
TelPay Software

Financial services companies based in Manitoba
Organizations based in Winnipeg
Downtown Winnipeg
Payroll
Payment service providers